Sergio Tenenbaum (born May 25, 1964) is a Brazilian-born Canadian philosopher and Professor of Philosophy at the University of Toronto.
He is known for his works on moral psychology and theory of action.

Books
Appearances of the Good (Cambridge, 2007)
Moral Psychology (Rodopi, 2007), ed.
Desire, Practical Reason, and the Good (Oxford, 2010), ed.
Rational Powers in Action (Oxford, 2020)

References

21st-century Canadian philosophers
Philosophy academics
Living people
Academic staff of the University of Toronto
Political philosophers
Moral psychologists
1964 births